Low Wormwood (Simplified Chinese: 低苦艾) is a band from Lanzhou, the capital city of Gansu Province. Their music style is folk, blending with rock and experimental elements. Low Wormwood observe and investigate the world using their music from the unique perspective of Northwesterners of China, mixed with strong feelings to their hometown, Lanzhou, a valley city with Yellow River crossing between two mountain ridges erected both sides of north and south. In July 2012, the band won the Best Chinese Band award at the 2012 Chinese Media Music Awards in Macau.

Members 

Vocal/Guitar: Liu Kun
Guitar: San Er
Bass: Xi Bin
Drums: Dou Tao

Discography

Studio albums
2009: 我们不由自主的亲吻对方 [We can't help kissing each other], 兵马司唱片
2001: 兰州 兰州 [Lanzhou Lanzhou], 兵马司唱片

兰州 兰州 (Lanzhou Lanzhou), which is the band's second album, named after the first track "Lanzhou Lanzhou", was issued in 2011. Though Lanzhou Lanzhou is written as a reference to the band's hometown, it is widely acknowledged by many people from different places who left their hometown.

References 

http://www.rockinchina.com/w/Low_Wormwood

External links 

Chinese musical groups